Rock Creek is a river in U.S. state of Iowa. It is a tributary of the Wapsipinicon River.

Rock Creek takes its name from the ancient rock it contains.

See also
List of rivers of Iowa

References

Rivers of Cedar County, Iowa
Rivers of Clinton County, Iowa
Rivers of Scott County, Iowa
Rivers of Iowa